Bendi (Mabendi) is a Central Sudanic language of northeastern Congo.

References

Central Sudanic languages